Minmi Wanderers Soccer Club (formerly Minmi Rangers Football Club) is Australian football club that was a foundation member of the Northern District British Football Association. It was the most successful club in the competition in the 1880s and 1890s.

The club now plays in Northern NSW Zone League One

History 
Minmi Rangers FC was formed on 9 September 1884. Members of the inaugural team were expatriate Scottish coal miners who had settled in Minmi. By 1886 the Rangers had won their first Newcastle & District premiership. They proceeded to win the premierships of 1887, 1888, 1889, 1891, 1892 and 1893. During the same period, they won the knockout Ellis Cup competition in 1886, 1887, 1888, 1890, 1892, 1893, 1895 and 1898.

Recent research by Dr Jeffrey Green has cast doubt on the year Minmi Rangers was formed. Green contends that Minmi was probably formed in 1886, a year after Lambton Thistle. Lambton Thistle only played in 1885 and number of its players were playing for Minmi in 1886.

Minmi's biggest triumph came in 1892, when it claimed the Gardiner Cup. The Gardiner Cup was, from 1885 to 1928, the biggest prize in New South Wales football. Minmi 3-0 triumphed in the final against Sydney namesakes, Pyrmont Rangers.

The fortunes of Minmi Rangers FC had dwindled by the turn of the century. No further success would come after 1898. A downturn in the local coal industry saw players depart Minmi, and by 1911 the club had lost its senior competition status.

According to the History of Soccer in NSW, Minmi Wanderers were formed in 1907. Some newspaper references describe them playing in green.

Minmi have made a little resurgence in recent years, making their way up to Zone League One in 2021, the 4th tier in Northern NSW Football and 5th nationally.

See also 
 Soccer in Australia
 Northern NSW Football

References 

1884 establishments in Australia
Soccer clubs in New South Wales
1911 disestablishments in Australia
Mining soccer clubs in Australia